Jessie Busley (1869 – 1950) was an American actress and comedian who performed on stage, screen, and radio for over six decades.

Career 

Jessie starred on stage in over 25 Charles Frohman productions in the first 15 years of her career. Later in June 1930, she would appear on film for the first time in The Devil's Parade A Musical Revue set in Hades, a 10-minute film short by Warner Bros. Pictures alongside actress Joan Blondell.

Jessie went on to appear in such films as Brother Rat and Brother Rat and a Baby. In 1939, she appeared alongside Kay Francis, James Stephenson, and Humphrey Bogart in King of the Underworld. The next year she would appear in Humphrey Bogart's It All Came True.

Personal life

Several months after they were married, Ernest Joy tried to shoot a theatrical press agent in a jealous rage after he saw him leaving a theater with Jessie. Word of the shot was reported in the news of the time and the press agent left town. Later that same year, Jessie and Ernest separated after it was reported that she had him arrested for "annoying her". All charges were dropped when she did not testify against him. 

She made The New York Times when an article appeared August 1, 1908, claiming she had "Set Two Men on her husband Ernest C. Joy who she intended to divorce." The article's title read "Ernest C. Joy Says His Wife, Jessie Busley, Set Two Men on Him. HE IS SENT TO A HOSPITAL One of His Unidentified Assailants Beat Him Over the Head with an Iron Bar." The article went on to say that they had frequent quarrels and end by saying that (at that time) "She last appeared in 'The Bishop's Carriage' in which she made a hit". Lastly leaving the parting shot that "She is well known as an actress but has had more success in the south and west then [sic] in this city".

Stage roles
 +Not on Broadway

Aug 25, 1895-
The Sporting Duchess, Academy of Music, 212 performances

Daly's Theatre

Nov 27, 1899 - Feb 4, 1900
The Manoeuvres of Jane [Original, Play, Comedy]

Garden Theatre

Feb 21, 1900 - May 1900
Hearts Are Trumps [Original, Play, Melodrama]

The National Theatre
+(Washington, DC)

October 22–27, 1900
Hearts Are Trumps [Original, Play, Melodrama]

[Herald Square Theatre]

May 20, 1901 - Jul 8, 1901
The Brixton Burglary [Original, Play, Farce]

Criterion Theatre

Aug 26, 1901 - Dec 1901
A Royal Rival [Original, Play, Drama]

Garrick Theatre

Mar 17, 1902 - Apr 1902
Sky Farm [Original, Play, Comedy]

Garrick Theatre

Aug 25, 1902 - Sep 1902
The New Clown [Original, Play, Farce]

Hoyt's Theatre

Sep 30, 1902 - Nov 1902
The Two Schools [Original, Play]

Empire Theatre

Jan 5, 1904 - Jan 1904
Little Mary [Original, Play]

Savoy Theatre, (1/11/1905 - 1/29/1905)
Lyceum Theatre, (1/30/1905 - 4/30/1905)

Jan 11, 1905 - Apr 30, 1905
Mrs. Leffingwell's Boots [Original, Play, Comedy]

Grand Opera House

Feb 25, 1907 - Mar 1907
In the Bishop's Carriage [Original, Play]

New Theatre

Nov 11, 1909 - [unknown]
The Cottage in the Air [Original, Play]

New Theatre

Jan 3, 1910 - Jan 3, 1910
Liz the Mother [Original, Play]

New Theatre

Mar 28, 1910 - [unknown]
The Winter's Tale [Revival, Play, Comedy]

New Theatre

Dec 19, 1910 - [unknown]
Old Heidelberg [Revival, Play]

Liberty Theatre

Nov 23, 1914 - Nov 1914
Twelfth Night [Revival, Play, Comedy]

Hudson Theatre

Sep 18, 1916 - Dec 1916
Pollyanna [Original, Play]

Playhouse Theatre

Oct 15, 1919 - Oct 1919
A Young Man's Fancy [Original, Play, Comedy]

Playhouse Theatre

Oct 25, 1926 - Jan 1927
Daisy Mayme [Original, Play, Comedy]
[Daisy Mayme Plunkett]

Lyceum Theatre

Dec 28, 1928 - Jan 1929
To-Morrow [Original, Play]
[Grace]

Broadhurst Theatre

Nov 19, 1930 - Dec 1930
An Affair of State [Original, Play, Comedy]
[Aunt Augusta]

48th Street Theatre

Oct 6, 1931 - Dec 1931
The Streets of New York, or Poverty is No Crime [Revival, Play, Melodrama]
[Mrs. Puffy]

48th Street Theatre

Oct 14, 1931 - Oct 1931
Pillars of Society [Revival, Play, Drama]
[Miss Rummel]

Fulton Theatre

Dec 26, 1931 - Mar 1932
The Bride the Sun Shines On [Original, Play, Comedy]
[Mrs. Marbury]

Belasco Theatre

Feb 20, 1933 - May 1933
Alien Corn [Original, Play]
[Mrs. Skeats]

Center Theatre

Sep 22, 1934 - Jun 8, 1935
The Great Waltz [Original, Musical, Operetta]
[Greta]

Center Theatre

Aug 5, 1935 - Sep 16, 1935
The Great Waltz [Original, Musical, Operetta]
[Greta]

Music Box Theatre

Nov 26, 1935 - Jun 1936
First Lady [Original, Play, Comedy]
[Belle Hardwick]

Ethel Barrymore Theatre

Dec 26, 1936 - Jul 1938
The Women [Original, Play, Comedy]
[Mrs. Morehead]

Music Box Theatre

Jan 3, 1944 - Jul 8, 1944
Over 21 [Original, Play]
[Mrs. Armina Gates]

John Golden Theatre

Nov 9, 1945 - Dec 1, 1945
The Rich Full Life [Original, Play]
[Mother Fenwick]

Lyceum Theatre

Apr 25, 1949 - Apr 30, 1949
 The Happiest Years [Original, Play, Comedy]
[Alida Wentworth]

Films 

This filmography is believed to be complete.  
 The Devil's Parade (1930 short)
 Personal Maid (1931)
 Brother Rat (1938)
 King of the Underworld (1939) as Aunt Josephine
 Brother Rat and a Baby (1940)
 It All Came True (1940) as Mrs. Nora Taylor
 Escape to Glory (1940)

External links
 ACTRESS'S HUSBAND IS BADLY BEATEN; Ernest C. Joy Says His Wife, Jessie Busley, Set Two Men on Him. HE IS SENT TO A HOSPITAL.
 "A History of the New York Stage from the First Performance in 1732 to 1901" 
Jessie Busley in her Winton 16 motorcar(flickr)

1869 births
1950 deaths
20th-century American actresses
19th-century American actresses
American stage actresses
American film actresses
Actors from Albany, New York
Actresses from New York (state)